Emmenomma is a genus of South American tangled nest spiders first described by Eugène Simon in 1884.  it contains only three species.

References

External links

Amaurobiidae
Araneomorphae genera
Spiders of South America
Taxa named by Eugène Simon